Melissa Amber Schuman (born August 21, 1984) is an American singer and actress best known for her role in the all-girl teen band Dream and their platinum hit "He Loves U Not".

Schuman has gained some success in acting with appearances in movies, including Love Don't Cost a Thing, The Hollow and Silent Scream. Schuman appeared on The Tonight Show with Jay Leno and hosted TRL.

Career 
In 2002, after Schuman announced she was leaving Dream to focus on her acting career and a solo album, she appeared in Love Don't Cost a Thing and The Hollow, and starred in Silent Scream. She recorded a song with The Hollow costar Nick Carter called "There for Me" in 2004.

She had plans to release her first single "Don't" but the single and solo album were scrapped. As of November 16, 2010, the unreleased single "Don't" was released to iTunes.

On November 15, 2010, Schuman's unreleased solo album Stereotyped was released to iTunes.

2008–2012: Lady Phoenix 
On January 28, 2008, Schuman reported that she would be forming a new music group with former Dream bandmate Ashley Poole, and would be auditioning for girls and even starring in a reality show to detail the new group's formation.

In 2012, Schuman confirmed that Lady Phoenix had disbanded following Ashley Poole's departure from the group and the reality show was not picked up by any networks.

2015–2016: Dream comeback 
On May 11, 2015, the original members of Dream got together for a mini-reunion and posted a video online performing a cappella version of their 2000 single "He Loves U Not" and the video quickly went viral with over 23,000 views and gained online attention from MTV, Seventeen Magazine, and other media sites.

On May 29, 2015, the original members of Dream all announced they were making a comeback and launched Twitter and Facebook pages. The Twitter page gained over 21,000 followers since its launch.

On December 17, 2015, Dream recorded and released a studio recording of "O Holy Night" as a treat to fans for the holidays while they work on new music scheduled for 2016.

On July 8, 2016, Dream joined other Y2K bands O-Town, Ryan Cabrera and 98 Degrees on the My2K Tour performing in 39 cities across the United States. Dream also performed at The MixTape Festival at Hershey Stadium alongside Paula Abdul, New Kids on the Block, Boyz II Men, 98 Degrees, O-Town and Ryan Cabrera.

On August 2, 2016, Dream released their first single together in 15 years titled "I Believe" on iTunes and Spotify.

On October 5, 2016, Dream member Ashley Poole announced via Snapchat and Facebook that Dream has once again disbanded and a new album will not be released.

Personal life 
Schuman married dancer Brandon Henschel on June 7, 2006, in San Diego, California.

On February 19, 2010, Schuman announced on Twitter that she and her husband were expecting their first child, a boy. On July 18, 2010, the Henschels announced the boy's birth.

On November 21, 2017, Schuman claimed that she was raped by singer and Backstreet Boys member Nick Carter in 2002, an accusation Carter has denied. The case filed by Schuman was dismissed by the Los Angeles District Attorney in September 2018 because the statute of limitations had passed. She is an advocate for victims of sexual abuse.

Schuman is a Christian.

Discography

Solo 
Stereotyped (2002/2010)

Dream 
It Was All a Dream (2001)

Filmography

References

External links 
  
 
 

1984 births
21st-century American actresses
21st-century American singers
20th-century American actresses
20th-century American singers
Place of birth missing (living people)
American film actresses
Dream (American group)
Living people
20th-century American women singers
21st-century American women singers
American Christians